The Blue Dahlia is a fantastic ballet in two acts, with libretto and choreography by Marius Petipa and music by Cesare Pugni, first presented by the Imperial Ballet on  at the Imperial Bolshoi Kamenny Theatre in St. Petersburg, Russia, with Mariia Surovshchikova-Petipa (as the Blue Dahlia) and Timofei Stukolkin (as Beausoleil).

Marius Petipa renewed the first act of this ballet in 1875 for a debut of his daughter, Marie Petipa.

Revivals
The ballet was revived by Pavel Gerdt for the Imperial Ballet and presented at the Imperial Mariinsky Theatre, St. Petersburg on March 5–18, 1905 with Lubov Egorova (as the Blue Dahlia). Petipa disliked Gerdt's 1905 revival to such a degree that he requested his name be removed from the program.

See also
 List of ballets by title

Ballets by Marius Petipa
Ballets by Cesare Pugni
1860 ballet premieres
Ballets premiered at the Bolshoi Theatre, Saint Petersburg